Philipp Nedel is a German music engineer and record producer of classical music. Nedel has won two Grammy Awards in the category of Best Small Ensemble Performance (2001 for After Mozart - Raskatov, Silvestrov & Schnittke, and 2007 for Stravinsky: Apollo, Concerto In D; Prokofiev.

References

External links
https://www.adam-audio.com/en/news/adam-users/video-interview-philipp-nedel-b-sharp/

Living people
Grammy Award winners
Year of birth missing (living people)